Peleopoda navigatrix is a moth in the family Depressariidae. It was described by Edward Meyrick in 1912. It is found in Colombia.

The wingspan is about 25 mm. The forewings are shining white, with a faint ochreous tinge and an irregular blackish spot on the base of the costa. There is an irregular-edged triangular blackish patch occupying the median third of the costa and reaching half across the wing. An indistinct cloudy light grey curved shade is found from two-thirds of the costa to the dorsum before the tornus. There is some faint light grey suffusion towards the apex. The hindwings are ochreous whitish.

References

Moths described in 1912
Peleopoda